Darrel Young (born April 8, 1987) is a former American football fullback. He is currently the player development director for the Pittsburgh Steelers. He was signed by the Washington Redskins as an undrafted free agent as a linebacker prospect in 2009. He played college football at Villanova University.

Early years
Young attended and played high school football at Amityville Memorial High School.

College career
Young attended and played college football at Villanova from 2005 to 2007. In the 2005 season, he had 13 tackles, three sacks, two tackles for loss, a pass break-up, and a blocked kick. In the 2006 season, he played in 11 games and had 44 tackles, 4.5 tackles for loss, one sack, one forced fumble, and two blocked kicks. In the 2007 season, he played in 11 games and had 78 total tackles, four tackles for loss, one interception, and two pass break-ups. In the 2008 season, 73 total tackles, nine tackles for a loss, two sacks, and three pass breakups.

Professional career

Washington Redskins

2009 season
On May 4, 2009, Young signed with the Washington Redskins as an undrafted free agent. He was waived by on September 5, 2009, but added to the team's practice squad two days later. Young was released on September 24, 2009.

2010 season
Young signed a futures contract with the Washington Redskins on January 5, 2010.
When he reported for camp, Young was surprised to learn that he had been converted to a fullback. Head coach Mike Shanahan stated, "Just the way he hit, we needed some fullbacks and we thought since he had good hands he might be the ideal candidate," which was the reason for Young's transition.
The position wasn't completely foreign to Young, who was recruited to Villanova as a running back before he was moved to linebacker. He ended up making the Redskins' final 53-man roster as the backup fullback after all cuts were made.
On November 15, 2010, Young scored his first career receiving touchdown, a three-yard reception from Donovan McNabb, in a 59–28 loss to the Philadelphia Eagles.

2011 season
Young was named the starting fullback for the Washington Redskins at the beginning of training camp in 2011.
He scored his first career rushing touchdown in Week 15 in a 23–10 victory over the New York Giants. In Week 16 against the Minnesota Vikings, Young had a costly holding penalty called on him that nullified Brandon Banks's 59-yard touchdown run. Overall, in the 2011 season, he finished with 15 receptions for 146 receiving yards and six carries for 33 rushing yards and a rushing touchdown.

2012 season
Despite missing every preseason game, Young was able to start in the season opener against the New Orleans Saints. In the Week 6 38–26 win against the Minnesota Vikings, he caught a six-yard pass from Robert Griffin III for a touchdown. He scored his second touchdown for the season in a 31–6 victory over the Philadelphia Eagles after catching another six-yard pass in the endzone. Overall, in the 2012 season, he finished with 14 carries for 60 rushing yards to go along with eight receptions for 109 receiving yards and two receiving touchdowns.

2013 season
Set to be a restricted free agent in the 2013 season, Young re-signed with the Redskins to a $6.2 million, three-year contract on March 9, 2013. On November 3, 2013, Young recorded three rushing touchdowns, the last being the game-winning score in overtime against the San Diego Chargers.
He scored a 62-yard touchdown reception in a 24–16 loss to the Philadelphia Eagles in Week 11. Overall, he finished the 2013 season with 12 carries for 41 rushing yards and three rushing touchdowns to go along with four receptions for 71 receiving yards and a receiving touchdown.

2014 season
In the season opener against the Houston Texans, Young was the only one to score for the Redskins with a rushing touchdown in the 17–6 loss. In the Week 2 game against the Jacksonville Jaguars, he contributed to the 41–10 win with a 20-yard touchdown reception. Young scored two rushing touchdowns in the 27–24 victory over the Philadelphia Eagles in Week 16 that took the Eagles out of playoff contention. Overall, he finished the 2014 season with 11 receptions for 81 receiving yards and two receiving touchdowns to go along with nine carries for 22 rushing yards and three rushing touchdowns.

2015 season
In the 2015 season, Young's role in the offense was lessened. On the season, he totaled six carries for ten rushing yards to go along with six receptions for 22 receiving yards. After the season, he was not retained by the team.

Chicago Bears
On August 3, 2016, Young signed with the Chicago Bears. On August 28, 2016, he was released by the Bears.

Carolina Panthers
On January 4, 2017, Young signed a reserve/future contract with the Carolina Panthers. He was released on September 2, 2017.

Career statistics

References

External links

Official website
Villanova Wildcats bio
Washington Redskins bio

1987 births
Living people
People from Amityville, New York
Players of American football from New York (state)
American football linebackers
American football fullbacks
Chicago Bears players
Carolina Panthers players
Villanova Wildcats football players
Washington Redskins players